Penelope Alice Marjorie Seidler AM (nee Evatt, born 15 December 1938) is an Australian architect, former member of National Gallery of Australia Council, and current member of the NGA Foundation Board. She is also an accountant and director of the Sydney-based architectural firm Harry Seidler and associates. She was the wife and professional partner of architect Harry Seidler. She was the subject of the 2014 Archibald prize winning portrait by Fiona Lowry.

Early life 
Penelope grew up in Wahroonga, New South Wales, daughter of Clive Evatt (1900–1984), a prominent barrister and NSW Labor politician (MLA for Hurstville 1939–1959), and his wife Marjorie Hanna Evatt (née Andreas) (1903–1984), with two siblings, Elizabeth Evatt and Clive Evatt jr. The Evatt family home located at 69 Junction Road, Wahroonga is now known as "Parklands" and is listed on the NSW State Heritage Register.

Professional life 
Seidler is the director of Sydney-based architectural firm Harry Seidler and Associates.

She studied for her Bachelor of Architecture at the University of Sydney and was registered as an architect in 1964. She joined Seidler and Associates that year as architect and financial manager. She has been a Fellow of the Australian institute of Architects since 1983, sitting on the NSW executive council from 1982 to 1984.

She was a founding member of Chief executive Women (NSW) from 1990 to 2005.

She currently sits on UNSW's Faculty of the Built Environment advisory council.

Life as an art patron, supporter and collector 
Penelope Seidler has sat on the International Council of the Museum of Modern Art in New York since 1973, has been a Biennale of Sydney director since late 2010, and was deputy commissioner for the Australian Pavilion at the 2013 Venice Biennale. She was an International Advisory Board member of Vienna's Austrian Museum of Applied Arts/Contemporary Art, and is a former council member of the Australiana Fund.

In 1971 Seidler joined the Art Gallery of NSW Society's council being one of the first "volunteer guides".

In 1973, Seidler received an offer letter from New York's Museum of Modern Art requesting her to be one of the members of its International Council.

In 2008 she became the Member of the Order of Australia for her work in the visual arts and architecture. In 2011, she was made a Chevalier of the Légion d'Honneur by the French government and received an honorary Doctor of Letters from the University of NSW.

In 2018 Seidler made a gift to the University of Sydney to establish the Penelope Visiting Professorship in Architectural History. In 2021, the University made her an honorary Doctor of Architecture.

Personal life 

Penelope met Harry Seidler in 1957 at a fellow architect's drinks in North Sydney. They married on 15 December 1958, and had two children.

Awards 
 The house she designed with her husband 'Harry & Penelope Seidler House', Killara, NSW won the Royal Australian Institute of Architects' (NSW Chapter) Wilkinson Award in 1967
 Member of the Order of Australia (AM) in 2008
 Honorary Doctor of Letters by the University of NSW
 University of Sydney Alumni Award for Cultural Contribution recipient in 2017

References

Bibliography
Cawthorne, Z. (27 November 2013) "Architect with touch of genius" The Australian Jewish News: jewishnews.net.au
Elphick, N. (31 October 2014) "Art and Design: 'Penelope Seidler maintains interest in architecture, arts'" The Sydney Morning Herald: smh.com.au
Frampton, K., & Drew, P. (1992) "Harry Seidler: Four Decades of Architecture" New York: Thames and Hudson
Harry Seidler & Associates (2011) "Company Profile" seidler.net.au
Indesign Media Asia Pacific. (12 January 2015) "Community: 'Penelope Seidler In Conversation Art and Architecture" Habit Us Living, The Design Hunt Continues: habitusliving.com
Lehmann, M. (N.d) "Eye of the beholder" theaustralian.com.au
Media Office, UNSW. (18 December 2014) "Penelope Seidler backs best practice in architecture education" UNSW Newsroom: newsroom.unsw.edu.au
Mosman Daily. (1 December 2009) "Harry Will Never be Forgotten" Where I Live: mosman-daily.whereilive.com.au
Penelope Seidler filmed interview at the house for Monocle magazine, February 2016 entitled "Sydney Residence: Harry and Penelope Seidler House. February 2016" online at monocle.com – film duration 6:51min.
Specifier Magazine. (N.d). "Penelope Seidler" specifier.com.au

Living people
1938 births
National Gallery of Australia
Australian business executives
Australian women in business
Members of the Order of Australia
Australian women architects
21st-century Australian architects
20th-century Australian architects
Modernist architects
20th-century Australian women
21st-century Australian women